Katie-Jayne Grieve (born 8 March 1997) is an Australian rules footballer who played for Carlton and Fremantle in the AFL Women's (AFLW).

AFLW career
After being passed up on in the national draft less than a week earlier, Grieve was ultimately drafted by Carlton with the club's second pick and the twelfth selection overall in the same year's rookie draft. She was delisted by Carlton at the end of the 2018 season.

In October 2018, after leaving Carlton, Grieve joined Fremantle as a free agent. In June 2021, Fremantle delisted Grieve who played 14 games for the club.

References

External links 

1997 births
Living people
Carlton Football Club (AFLW) players
Australian rules footballers from Western Australia
Fremantle Football Club (AFLW) players